Kippen railway station co-served the village of Kippen, Stirling, Scotland, from 1856 to 1934 on the Forth and Clyde Junction Railway.

History 
The station was opened on 26 May 1856 by the Forth and Clyde Junction Railway. On the westbound platform is the station building, near the level crossing was the signal box and on the south side of the line is the goods yard. To the north was Boquan Tile Works, which was served by a siding. Despite its name, the station was situated a mile northeast of Kippen. The station closed on 1 October 1934.

References 

Disused railway stations in Stirlingshire
Railway stations in Great Britain opened in 1856
Railway stations in Great Britain closed in 1934
1856 establishments in Scotland
1934 disestablishments in Scotland